Leandro Gastón Otormín Fumero (born 30 July 1996) is a Uruguayan professional footballer who plays as a forward for Nacional.

Career
A youth academy graduate of Nacional, Otormín made his professional debut on 15 August 2015, coming on as a 74th minute substitute for Leandro Barcia in 4–1 win against Villa Teresa. While being on loan at Racing Montevideo, he scored his first senior goal on 7 February 2016 in a 2–0 win against El Tanque Sisley.

Otormín is a former Uruguay youth international and was included in squad for 2013 FIFA U-17 World Cup. He scored four goals from five matches in the tournament, netting braces against New Zealand and Slovakia. Along with Franco Acosta, he was also team's top scorer at the tournament.

References

External links

Living people
1996 births
Uruguayan footballers
Uruguayan expatriate footballers
People from Tacuarembó Department
Association football forwards
Club Nacional de Football players
Racing Club de Montevideo players
Venados F.C. players
Montevideo City Torque players
Cerro Largo F.C. players
Defensa y Justicia footballers
Uruguayan Primera División players
Ascenso MX players
Uruguayan expatriate sportspeople in Mexico
Uruguayan expatriate sportspeople in Argentina
Expatriate footballers in Mexico
Expatriate footballers in Argentina